Sumarlidi Sigurdsson  (died between 1014 and 1018) was jointly Earl of Orkney with his brothers Brusi and Einar Wry-Mouth following the death of their father, Sigurd Hlodvisson at the battle of Clontarf. Their half-brother, Thorfinn, was at that time very young, perhaps only five years old, and he was sent to be fostered by his grandfather, King Malcolm II.

The sagas depict Sumarlidi as a wise, quiet and peaceful man. More is not told about him, other than that he died of illness in his bed only shortly after he became earl. After he was gone, there was a quarrel between Einarr and Thorfinn about who would inherit his part of the earldom.

References
 Anon., Orkneyinga Saga: The History of the Earls of Orkney, tr. Hermann Pálsson and Paul Edwards. Penguin, London, 1978. 
 Orknøyingasoga, page 29 'Um Brødrene', translated by Gustav Indrebø (Oslo 1929)

Earls of Orkney
1010s deaths
Year of birth unknown